Lobesia fetialis is a moth of the family Tortricidae first described by Edward Meyrick in 1920. It is found in India, Sri Lanka, Java and Sumatra.

Description
The wingspan of the adult male is 11–15 mm and the female is 9.5-11.5 mm. Head whitish ochreous. Antenna brownish. Palpus with whitish basal and terminal segments, and tip of median segment, whereas median segment except tip is pale tawny. Thorax pale ochreous. There is a fuscous transverse band irregularly mixed and spotted with brownish fuscous. An irrorated (speckled) brownish spot is found before the apex of the tegula. The fuscous abdomen is long, slender and dorsoventrally flattened. Abdominal scent pouches are oval and broad with yellowish scales. Forewings narrow and elongate. Costa faintly convex. Pterostigma strong, thickened, and strongly projecting along costal edge. Termen round. Forewings are pale ochreous with brownish-grey partial irrorations. Costal edge whitish. Markings are light tawny and fuscous brown. Cilia pale ochreous. Hindwings deformed with pointed apex. Colour hyaline with faint prismatic reflections. Cilia white.

In the female, the abdomen is pale golden-ochreous whitish with light greyish-fuscous irrorations. Venter whitish fuscous. A faint bronzy gloss visible on venter. Forewings broader and shorter than in male. Well developed pterostigma.

Larval food plants are Lantana camara, Bridelia, Evodia accedens, Tarenna asiatica, Clerodendron serratum, Barringtonia spicata, Allophylus cobbe and Jasminum species.

References

Moths of Asia
Moths described in 1920